The following is a list of the MTV Europe Music Award winners and nominees for Best Romanian Act.

2000s

2010s

Best Romanian & Moldovan Act

See also 
 MTV Romania Music Awards

MTV Europe Music Awards
Romanian music awards
Awards established in 2002
2002 establishments in Europe